A metropolis is a large city.

Metropolis may also refer to:

Buildings
 Metropolis Fremantle, a performance venue in Fremantle, Western Australia
 Metropolis at Metrotown, British Columbia, Canada
 10 Dundas East or Metropolis, Ontario, Canada
 Métropolis (concert hall), Montreal, Quebec, Canada
 M-Towers or Metropolis Towers, Gżira, Malta
 Metropolis (Auckland building), New Zealand
 Metropolis Building, Madrid, Spain
 Metropolis (Los Angeles), a high-rise residential complex in California, U.S.
 Metropolis at Dadeland, Kendall, Florida, U.S.
 Metropolis (mall), Indiana, U.S.
 Metropolis Theatre (Bronx, New York), U.S.

Film, TV, and radio
 Metropolis (1927 film), by Fritz Lang
 Metropolis (2001 film), an anime film by Rintaro
 Metropolis (musical), an adaptation of the 1927 film
 Metropolis (British TV series), a 2000 drama series
 Metropolis (American TV program), a 2015 travel guide documentary program
 Metropolis 2000: Scenes from New York, a concert film by Dream Theater
 Metropolis TV, a Dutch television program on life and cultures around the world
 Metropolis, a radio program hosted by Jason Bentley
 Metropolis, a fictional city in the TV series 21 Jump Street

Places
 Metropolis (Acarnania), a classical city in Acarnania, western Greece
 Metropolis (Amphilochia), a classical city in Amphilochia, western Greece
 Metropolis (Anatolia), a classical city in western Turkey
 Metropolis (Doris), a classical city in Doris, Greece
 Metropolis (Euboea), a classical city in Euboea, Greece
 Metropolis (Perrhaebia), a classical city in Thessaly, Greece
 Metropolis (northern Phrygia), a classical city in Asia Minor
 Metropolis (southern Phrygia), a classical city in Asia Minor
 Metropolis (Sarmatia), a classical city in Ukraine
 Metropolis (Thessaly), a classical city in Thessaly, Greece
 Metropolis (Troad), a classical city in Asia Minor
 Metropolis, Illinois, a city in Massac County, Illinois, United States
 Metropolis, Nevada, a ghost town in Elko County, Nevada, United States
 Metropolis in Asia, a Roman era city located in what is today Tratsa, Turkey
 Metropolis GZM, a metropolitan unit in the Silesian Voivodeship of Poland
 Metropolis of Lyon, a French territorial collectivity
 Metropolis, a nickname of New York City
 The Metropolis, an administrative region that was a precursor to the County of London

Literature
 Metropolis (novel), a novel by Thea von Harbou, written in tandem with the 1927 film
 Metropolis (architecture magazine)
 Metropolis (free magazine), a Japanese city guide
 The Metropolis, a 1908 novel by Upton Sinclair 
 Metropolis, a 2019 crime novel by Philip Kerr

Comic books
 Metropolis (comics), a fictional American city in DC comics and home to Superman
 Captain Metropolis, a character in the Watchmen comics series
 Superman's Metropolis, a comic book
 Metropolis (manga), a 1949 manga by Osamu Tezuka
 Metropolis Collectibles, a comic book dealer of vintage American comics

Music

Albums
 Metropolis (Peter Cincotti album), or the title song
 Metropolis (Client album)
 Metropolis (FM album)
 Metropolis (Guccini album)
 Metropolis (Robby Maria album)
 Metropolis: The Chase Suite, a 2007 album by Janelle Monáe
 Metropolis (Jeff Mills album)
 Metropolis (Seigmen album), or the title song
 Metropolis (Sister Machine Gun album)
 Metropolis (Swords album)
 Metropolis, a Future Crew tribute album
 Metropolis (EP), a 2019 extended play by Kompany
Metropolis Part I, a 2012 EP by The M Machine
 Metropolis Pt. 2: Scenes from a Memory, a 1999 album by Dream Theater

Songs
 "Metropolis" (Metropolis song), a 1992 song by The Future Sound of London under the alias Metropolis
 "Metropolis" (The Church song)
 "Metropolis—Part I: "The Miracle and the Sleeper"", a song by Dream Theater from Images and Words
 "Metropolis", a song by L'Arc-en-Ciel from Winter Fall
 "Metropolis", a song by B12 from Electro-Soma
 "Metropolis", a song by Gareth Emery
 "Metropolis", a song by Faded Paper Figures from Dynamo
 "Metropolis", a song by David Guetta & Nicky Romero
 "Metropolis", a song by Kraftwerk from The Man-Machine
 "Metropolis", a song by Motörhead from Overkill
 "Metropolis", a song by Nash the Slash from Children of the Night
 "Metropolis", a song by Owl City from The Midsummer Station
 "Metropolis", a song by The Pogues from If I Should Fall From Grace With God
 "Metropolis", a song by Pseudo Echo from Race
 "Metropolis", a song by Scooter from Under the Radar Over the Top
 "Metropolis", a song by The Vision Bleak from The Deathship Has a New Captain
 "Metropolis", a song by Zion I from Mind Over Matter

Other uses in music
 Metropolis (band), a German 1970s progressive rock band, or their 1974 eponymous album
 Strange Advance, a 1980s Canadian New Wave band that had to change its name from Metropolis because of the existence of the above band
 Metropolis (barbershop quartet), a singing group from the US
 Metropolis Records, a record label in Philadelphia
 Metropolis Records (Serbia), a record label in Belgrade
 Metropolis Symphony, a symphonic work by Michael Daugherty
 Metropolis: a Fantasy in Blue, a composition by Ferde Grofé
 Metropolis, stage name of one of the members of Foreign Beggars

Religion
 Metropolis (religious jurisdiction) or episcopal see. Usually has supervisory oversight of a number of suffragan dioceses 
 Metropolitan bishop who is the ordinary of the metropolitan see

Other uses
 Metropolis (surname)
 Metropolis (Grosz), a 1916-1917 painting by George Grosz
 Metropolis (Dix), a 1928 painting by Otto Dix
 Metropolis Asia, an annual arts festival held in Guwahati, India
 Metropolis Coffee Company, a specialty coffee company in Chicago, Illinois
 Metropolis in France, a form of intercommunality in France
 Metropolis Group, holding company for Metropolis Studios, a recording studio in London
 Metropolis International, a predominantly UK-based media and technology group
 Metropolis Lab, an Indian multinational chain of diagnostic companies
 Metropolis Ltd, an American game company
 Metropolis Performing Arts Centre, a professional theatre company in Arlington Heights, Illinois
 Metropolis Project, a research network studying human migration
 Metropolis RFC, an American rugby team based in Minneapolis
 Alstom Metropolis, a type of metro train
 City New South Wales rugby league team or Metropolis
 Palantir Metropolis, a business software product
 Metropolis–Hastings algorithm, a statistical method
 Metropolis Zone, a level in Sonic the Hedgehog 2

See also
 Colonies in antiquity
 Metro (disambiguation)
 Metropol (disambiguation)
 Metropolis Rescore, a 2005 soundtrack album to the 1927 silent film by The New Pollutants
 Metropolitan (disambiguation)
 mTropolis, a multimedia programming application